Janne Madsen (born 12 March 1978) is a former Danish football midfielder. She lastly played for Fortuna Hjørring and the Danish national team. She played 390 matches for Fortuna.

References

Danish Football Union (DBU) statistics

1978 births
Living people
Danish women's footballers
Denmark women's international footballers
Fortuna Hjørring players
Women's association football midfielders
2007 FIFA Women's World Cup players